Khan Research Laboratories Football Club, sometimes abbreviated to KRL F.C. or KRL, is a Pakistani professional football club based in Rawalpindi. The club is affiliated with Khan Research Laboratories and the team play their home games at KRL Stadium. The club has won five league titles and six National Football Challenge Cups. They are the most successful club in the country with eleven trophies. They are the only Pakistani club to reach a continental club finals when they reached the 2013 AFC President's Cup final, losing 1–0 to Balkan FK.

History
Khan Research Laboratories entered the National Championship in the 1998 season, where they lost 2–0 to Allied Bank in the quarter-finals. The next year they reached the semi-finals of the National Championship, after finishing top of their group and winning both their group matches 4–1 and 6–3 against Pakistan Railways and Balochistan Red respectively. They defeated Karachi Metropolitan 4–0 and Pakistan Railways 3–2 on penalties after drawing the game 2–2 in normal time. They lost 1–0 to Pakistan Navy in the semi-finals. In the 2000 season, Khan Research Laboratories reached the Round of 16, after topping the group again after defeating Punjab Greens and WAPDA 8–1 and 3–0 respectively. In the Round of 16 they lost 1–0 to that season's runners-up Karachi Port Trust. The next season, they topped the group again when they defeated Pakistan Police and Sindh Greens 1–0 and 5–1 respectively. Sajjad of Khan Research Laboratories scored the hat-trick in the latter match. In the round of 16, they trashed University Grants Commission 6–0, with Allah Nawaz scoring four goals. In the quarter-finals they defeated Allied Bank 3–2 and defeated their group team Pakistan Police 2–1 in the semi-finals. Khan Research Laboratories drew 1–1 to WAPDA in the finals, only to lose 4–3 on penalties. In the 2002 season, Khan Research Laboratories, top of the group again for the fourth consecutive season, defeated University Grants Commission 5–1 and drew 1–1 with Sindh Red. In the Round of 16, they defeated Balochistan Green 1–0. Khan Research Laboratories defeated Federally Administered Tribal Areas 2–1 in the quarter-finals and lost to Pakistan Army in the 1–0 in the semi-finals.

Premier League era
Khan Research Laboratories became a dominant side since the inception of the re-branded Pakistan Premier League, finishing third in the 2004–05 season, scoring 98 goals in 30 matches, winning 23 and drawing and losing four and three matches respectively. They finished third in four further seasons, 2005–06, 2006–07, 2007–08, and 2008–09 seasons, before winning their first-ever league and national title in the 2009–10 season, when they won the league on goal difference after being tied on 60 points. Khan Research Laboratories had a goal difference +32 against +22 of Pakistan Army. Khan Research Laboratories completed the double, when they won the 2009 National Football Challenge Cup defeating Pakistan Airlines 1–0 in the finals. In the 2010–11 season, they finished second to league winners WAPDA. However, they successfully defended the National Football Challenge Cup, defeating Pakistan Navy 4–0 in the finals. Khan Research Laboratories won three league titles consecutively, winning in 2011–12, 2012–13 and 2013–14. In the 2011–12 and 2012–13 season, Khan Research Laboratories completed a consecutive double when they won the League and Challenge Cup. In latter seasons, they won the league after their star forward Kaleemullah Khan, scored 35 goals, including 7 hat-tricks. In the 2014–15 season, they finished sixth after losing their star players, Kaleemullah Khan and Muhammad Adil to Kyrgyz club FC Dordoi Bishkek. They won a further two Challenge Cups in 2015 and 2016, becoming the most successful club in the National Football Challenge Cup, winning the tournament six times in total. Khan Research Laboratories won their fifth 2018–19 Premier League title after defeating Sui Southern Gas 4–0 on the final match day, making them the most successful club since the inception of the Pakistan Premier League.

Asian competitions
Khan Research Laboratories' first appearance in the Asian competition came in the 2010 AFC President's Cup, when they finished second to Vakhsh Qurghonteppa in the group stage. In the 2012 AFC President's Cup, they finished second in the group stage after drawing both their games 0–0 against Erchim and Taiwan Power Company, thus qualifying for the final stage where they finished bottom of the group. 
Their win in the 2012 season qualified them for a spot in the 2013 AFC President's Cup. In the group stage, held in May 2013, they were drawn against Kyrgyzstan-based Dordoi Bishkek, Philippine-based Global and Bhutan-based Yeedzin. KRL drew 1–1 with Dordoi, beat Global 2–0 and also went past Yeedzin 8–0. They finished second in the group behind Dordoi based on goal difference as both clubs had 7 points from their 3 encounters (2 wins, 1 draw). Through this result, the club qualified for the final group stage of the Cup which was played in September 2013.  In the final group stage, they were drawn against the Palestinian side Hilal Al-Quds and their rivals from the first group stage, Kyrgyzstani side Dordoi Bishkek.  They won both of their games and progressed to the final, where they lost 1–0 to Turkmen side Balkan. In the 2014 AFC President's Cup they finished bottom of the group in the first stage.

Colours
The club colours, reflected in their crest and kit, are dark green and white.

Honors

Domestic
Pakistan Premier League: (5)
2009–10, 2011–12, 2012–13, 2013–14, 2018–19

Pakistan National Football Challenge Cup: (6)
2009, 2010, 2011, 2012, 2015, 2016

NBP President's Cup: (1)
2017

Continental
AFC President's Cup
Runners-up (1): 2013

Competitive record

Overall
The club's competitive record since the 2004–05 season are listed below.

Performance in AFC competitions
 Asian Cup Winners Cup: 1 appearance
2000/01: First Round

 AFC President's Cup: 4 appearances
2010: 2° in Group Stage
2012: 3° in Final Group Stage
2013: 3° in Runners Up
2014: 4° in Group Stage

AFC President's Cup matches

References

Football clubs in Pakistan
1995 establishments in Pakistan
Association football clubs established in 1995
Works association football clubs in Pakistan
Football in Rawalpindi